Dromore Road railway station served Dromore in  County Tyrone in Northern Ireland.

The Londonderry and Enniskillen Railway opened the station on 16 January 1854. It was taken over by the Great Northern Railway (Ireland) in 1883.

It closed on 1 October 1957.

Routes

References

Disused railway stations in County Tyrone
Railway stations opened in 1854
Railway stations closed in 1957
1854 establishments in Ireland
Railway stations in Northern Ireland opened in the 19th century